Fra Diavolo, ou L'hôtellerie de Terracine (Fra Diavolo, or The Inn of Terracina) is an opéra comique in three acts by the French composer Daniel Auber,  from a libretto by Auber's regular collaborator Eugène Scribe.  It is loosely based on the life of the Itrani guerrilla leader Michele Pezza, active in southern Italy in the period 1800-1806, who went under the name of Fra Diavolo ("Brother Devil").

The opera was first performed by the Opéra-Comique at the Salle Ventadour in Paris on 28 January 1830 and an Italian version was prepared by Auber and Scribe for performance in London in 1857. This contained new recitatives and arias, as well as expanding the roles of Fra Diavolo's accomplices.

The opera was Auber's greatest success, one of the most popular works of the 19th century and was in the standard repertory in its original French as well as German and Italian versions.  An English translation was also prepared.  Hugh Macdonald has characterised this comic opera as "the most successful work of its kind before Offenbach."

Roles

Synopsis

Zerline, daughter of the innkeeper of Terracina, is in love with an impoverished soldier, Lorenzo, but her father wants her to marry the rich old Francesco. Lorenzo is in pursuit of the notorious bandit Fra Diavolo. Diavolo himself arrives at the inn disguised as a marquis and robs two English travellers, Lord and Lady Cockburn. Lorenzo manages to retrieve part of the stolen goods and is rewarded with enough money to marry Zerline. Diavolo is determined to rob the travellers again and enlists the help of his two comical henchmen, Giacomo and Beppo. During the night the three of them sneak into Zerline's room and steal her dowry. Lorenzo appears and mistakes the 'marquis' for a rival in love. The next day Zerline is forced to marry Francesco as she now no longer has her dowry. Diavolo instructs his henchmen to warn him when Lorenzo and his troop of soldiers have left the town so he can safely rob again, but the two are recognised in the crowd by Zerline and Diavolo is tricked into appearing and arrested when the signal is given as arranged. Zerline is free to marry Lorenzo again.

Recordings
 Urania URLP-204: Irma Beilke, Marie Louise Schlip, Hans Hopf, Lorenz Fehenberger, Karl Wessly, Arno Schellenberg, Gottlob Frick, Kurt Böhme; Chorus of the Dresden State Opera; Staatskapelle Dresden; Karl Elmendorff, conductor
 EMI Classics: Nicolai Gedda, Mady Mesplé, Jane Berbié, Jules Bastin, Ensemble Choral Jean Laforge, Monte-Carlo Philharmonic Orchestra; Marc Soustrot, conductor (1984)

Film
Expanding and renaming the roles of Beppo and Giacomo, respectively, Laurel and Hardy starred as "Stanlio" and "Ollio" in the 1933 feature film Fra Diavolo (sometimes titled as The Devil's Brother or Bogus Bandits) based on Auber's opera.  There is not a great deal of singing in the film.  Much of the chorus material is intact, and Diavolo has three numbers; however, Zerline gets to sing only the small bit necessary to the plot (singing when she undresses), Stanlio and Ollio only repeat songs heard by others, and no one else sings.

References
Notes

Sources
 Holden, Amanda (Ed.), The New Penguin Opera Guide, New York: Penguin Putnam, 2001. 
 Schneider, Herbert, "Fra Diavolo" in The New Grove Dictionary of Opera, ed. Stanley Sadie (London, 1992) 
 Tubeuf, André, Notes accompanying the Soustrot recording

External links
 Fra Diavolo : opéra comique en trois actes, 1860 publication, French, digitization by BYU on archive.org

Opéras comiques
Operas by Daniel Auber
Libretti by Eugène Scribe
French-language operas
Operas
1830 operas
Opera world premieres at the Opéra-Comique
Operas set in Italy
Operas adapted into films
Cultural depictions of Fra Diavolo